The 2010 Chinese Taipei Figure Skating Championships took place between 15 and 16 August 2009 at the Taipei Arena in Taipei. Skaters competed in the disciplines of men's singles and ladies' singles on the senior, junior, and novice levels.

Senior results

Men

Ladies

Junior results

Men

Ladies

Novice results

Boys

Girls

References

External links
 Results
 Chinese Taipei Figure Skating

Chinese Taipei Figure Skating Championships
Chinese Taipei Figure Skating Championships, 2010
2009 in figure skating